Blakemere is a parish in Herefordshire, England. It is 11 miles west of Hereford, on the road to Hay-on-Wye.

External links

Distinguish from
 Blakemere visitors' centre near Sandiway in Cheshire
 Wyeside information page

Villages in Herefordshire